Javier Eduardo Iritier (born 20 December 1994) is an Argentine professional footballer who plays as an left winger for Aldosivi.

Career
Iritier started his senior career in 2016 with Huracán. He made his debut in the Argentine Primera División on 29 October in a 1–1 draw with Rosario Central, prior to making four further appearances throughout 2016–17 before being released in December 2016. In February 2017, Iritier joined fellow Primera División team Estudiantes. His first appearance for the club came during the 2017 Copa Libertadores group stage in a 2–1 defeat to Botafogo on 14 March, which was followed on Matchday 4 with Iritier scoring his first career goal in a 4–1 loss to Atlético Nacional. Iritier left in August 2017 without making a league appearance.

On 16 August 2017, Iritier joined Tigre of the Argentine Primera División. His Tigre debut arrived on 10 September versus Chacarita Juniors. A move to Aldosivi was completed in July 2018. One goal in fifteen games occurred for them. On 16 August 2019, Iritier went abroad to join Super League Greece 2 side Apollon Smyrnis. He made his first appearance against Ergotelis on 29 September, before netting his sole goal for the club on 20 December versus Panachaiki. In September 2020, following eight matches for the Greek outfit as they won promotion, Iritier returned to Aldosivi.

Career statistics
.

References

External links

1994 births
Living people
People from La Matanza Partido
Argentine footballers
Association football wingers
Argentine expatriate footballers
Club Atlético Huracán footballers
Estudiantes de La Plata footballers
Club Atlético Tigre footballers
Aldosivi footballers
Apollon Smyrnis F.C. players
Argentine Primera División players
Super League Greece 2 players
Expatriate footballers in Greece
Argentine expatriate sportspeople in Greece
Sportspeople from Buenos Aires Province